Hindutva ("Hindu-ness") is the predominant form of Hindu nationalism in India. The term was formulated as a political ideology by Vinayak Damodar Savarkar in 1923. It is used by the Rashtriya Swayamsevak Sangh (RSS), the Vishva Hindu Parishad (VHP), the Bharatiya Janata Party (BJP) and other organisations, collectively called the Sangh Parivar.

The Hindutva movement has been described as a variant of right-wing extremism, and as "almost fascist in the classical sense", adhering to a concept of homogenised majority and cultural hegemony. Some analysts dispute the identification of Hindutva with fascism, and suggest Hindutva is an extreme form of conservatism or "ethnic absolutism".

Definitions

Tertiary sources
According to the Oxford English Dictionary (OED), Hindutva is "Originally: the state or quality of being Hindu; ‘Hinduness’. Now: an ideology advocating, or movement seeking to establish, the hegemony of Hindus and Hinduism within India; Hindu nationalism." Its etymology, according to the OED, is: "from modern Sanskrit hindutva (Hindu qualities, Hindu identity) from hindu (from Hindi hindū : see Hindu n.) + classical Sanskrit -tva , suffix forming abstract nouns, after Hindi hindupan, in the same sense."  The etymology and meaning of hindu, according to the OED is: "Partly a borrowing from Hindi and Urdu. Partly a borrowing from Persian. Etymons: Urdu hindū, Persian hindū.  from (i) Hindi hindū and Urdu hindū, originally denoting a person from India, now specifically a follower of Hinduism, and its etymon (ii) Persian hindū, in the same senses (Middle Persian hindūg, denoting a person from India), apparently formed already in Old Persian ... hindu, denoting an eastern province of the Achaemenid empire."

According to Merriam-Webster's Encyclopedia of World Religions, Hindutva is a concept of "Indian cultural, national, and religious identity". The term "conflates a geographically based religious, cultural, and national identity: a true 'Indian' is one who partakes of this Hindu-ness. Some Indians insist, however, that Hindutva is primarily a cultural term to refer to the traditional and indigenous heritage of the Indian nation-state, and they compare the relationship between Hindutva and India to that of Zionism and Israel." This view, as summarised by Merriam-Webster's Encyclopedia of World Religions, holds that "even those who are not religiously Hindu but whose religions originated in India – Jains, Buddhists, Sikhs, and others – share in this historical, cultural, and national essence. Those whose religions were imported to India, meaning primarily the country’s Muslim and Christian communities, may fall within the boundaries of Hindutva only if they subsume themselves into the majority culture".

According to the Concise Oxford Dictionary of Politics and International Relations, "Hindutva, translated as 'Hinduness,' refers to the ideology of Hindu nationalists, stressing the common culture of the inhabitants of the Indian subcontinent. ... Modern politicians have attempted to play down the racial and anti-Muslim aspects of Hindutva, stressing the inclusiveness of the Indian identity; but the term has Fascist undertones."  According to The Dictionary of Human Geography, "Hindutva encapsulates the cultural justification of Hindu nationalism, a 'Hinduness' allegedly shared by all Hindus."  According to A Political and Economic Dictionary of South Asia, "One of the main purposes behind the concept of Hindutva was to construct a collective identity to support the cause of 'Hindu-unity' (Hindu Sanghatan) and to avoid too narrow a definition of Hinduism, which had the consequence of excluding Buddhists, Sikhs and Jains from the Hindu community. Later, Hindu-nationalist ideologues transformed the concept into a strategy to include non-Hindus, in order to widen their social base, and for political mobilization.

According to Encyclopædia Britannica'''s article on Vinayak Damodar Savarkar, a Hindu and Indian nationalist, "Hindutva ("Hinduness") ... sought to define Indian culture as a manifestation of Hindu values; this concept grew to become a major tenet of Hindu nationalist ideology."  According to the Encyclopedia of Hinduism, Hindutva as defined in the classic statement of its ideology, is the "culture of the Hindu race" where Hinduism is but an element and "Hindu dharma is a religion practiced by Hindus as well as Sikhs and Buddhists". The article further states, "proponents of Hindutva have sought to promote the identification of national identity with the religious and broader cultural heritage of Hindus. Measures taken to achieve this end have included attempts to 'reclaim' individuals judged to have taken up 'alien' religions, the pursuit of social, cultural and philanthropic activities designed to strengthen awareness of Hindu belonging, and direct political action through various organisations, including recognized political parties such as the Bharatiya Janata Party (BJP)."

 Savarkar 
For Savarkar, in Hindutva: Who Is a Hindu?, Hindutva is an inclusive term of everything Indic. The three essentials of Hindutva in Savarkar's definition were the common nation (rashtra), common race (jati), and common culture or civilisation (sanskriti). Savarkar used the words "Hindu" and "Sindhu" interchangeably. Those terms were at the foundation of his Hindutva, as geographic, cultural and ethnic concepts, and "religion did not figure in his ensemble", states Sharma. His elaboration of Hindutva included all Indic religions, i.e. Hinduism, Buddhism, Jainism and Sikhism. Savarkar restricted "Hindu nationality" to "Indian religions" in the sense that they shared a common culture and fondness for the land of their origin.

According to Christophe Jaffrelot, a political scientist specialising in South Asia, Savarkar – declaring himself as an atheist – "minimizes the importance of religion in his definition of Hindu", and instead emphasises an ethnic group with a shared culture and cherished geography., Quote: "Savarkar had long lived abroad, and his Hindutva is a European product from its opening words on. [...] Savarkar was not a religious man; for him, traditional religious belief and practice did not lie at the heart of Hindutva. He did, however, consider the religion's cultural traditions to be key markers of Hindutva, along with geographical attachment to the motherland and a sense of oneself as a part of a "race determined by a common origin, possessing a common blood". To Savarkar, states Jaffrelot, a Hindu is "first and foremost someone who lives in the area beyond the Indus river, between the Himalayas and the Indian Ocean". Savarkar composed his ideology in reaction to the "pan-Islamic mobilization of the Khilafat movement", where Indian Muslims were pledging support to the Istanbul-based Caliph of the Ottoman Empire and to Islamic symbols, his thoughts predominantly reflect deep hostility to Islam and its followers. To Savarkar, states Jaffrelot, "Muslims were the real enemies, not the British", because their Islamic ideology posed "a threat to the real nation, namely Hindu Rashtra" in his vision. All those who reject this historic "common culture" were excluded by Savarkar. He included those who had converted to Christianity or Islam but accepted and cherished the shared Indic culture, considering them as those who can be re-integrated.

According to Chetan Bhatt, a sociologist specialising in Human Rights and Indian nationalism, Savarkar "distances the idea of Hindu and of Hindutva from Hinduism". He describes Hindutva, states Bhatt, as "one of the most comprehensive and bewildering synthetic concepts known to the human tongue" and "Hindutva is not a word but a history; not only the spiritual or religious history of our people as at times it is mistaken to be by being confounded with the other cognate term Hinduism, but a history in full".

Savarkar's notion of Hindutva formed the foundation for his Hindu nationalism. It was a form of ethnic nationalism per the criteria set by Clifford Geertz, Lloyd Fallers and Anthony D. Smith.

 Supreme Court of India 
The definition and the use of Hindutva and its relationship with Hinduism has been a part of several court cases in India. In 1966, the Chief Justice Gajendragadkar wrote for the Supreme Court of India in Yagnapurushdasji (AIR 1966 SC 1127), that "Hinduism is impossible to define". The court adopted Radhakrishnan's submission that Hinduism is complex and "the theist and atheist, the sceptic and agnostic, may all be Hindus if they accept the Hindu system of culture and life". The Court judged that Hinduism historically has had an "inclusive nature" and it may "broadly be described as a way of life and nothing more".

The 1966 decision has influenced how the term Hindutva has been understood in later cases, in particular the seven decisions of the Supreme Court in the 1990s that are now called the "Hindutva judgments". According to Ram Jethmalani, an Indian lawyer and a former president of its Supreme Court Bar Association, the Supreme Court of India in 1995 ruled that "Ordinarily, Hindutva is understood as a way of life or a state of mind and is not to be equated with or understood as religious Hindu fundamentalism ... it is a fallacy and an error of law to proceed on the assumption ... that the use of words Hindutva or Hinduism per se depicts an attitude hostile to all persons practising any religion other than the Hindu religion ... It may well be that these words are used in a speech to promote secularism or to emphasise the way of life of the Indian people and the Indian culture or ethos, or to criticise the policy of any political party as discriminatory or intolerant." According to Jethmalani, the Supreme Court has properly explained the "true meaning" of the term, and "Hindutva is not hostility to any organised religion nor does it proclaim its superiority of any religion to another". According to him, it is unfortunate that "the communal propaganda machinery relentlessly disseminates "Hindutva" as a communal word, something that has also become embedded in the minds and language of opinion leaders, including politicians, media, civil society and the intelligentsia". The Indian lawyer Abdul Noorani disagrees, and states that the Supreme Court in its 1995 ruling gave "Hindutva a benign meaning, calling Hindutva the same as Indianization, etc." and these were unnecessary digressions from the facts of the case, and in doing so, the court may have brought down the wall separating religion and politics".

History
Ideology
 
The word Hindutva was already in use by the late 1890s by Chandranath Basu, and later the national figure Bal Gangadhar Tilak. Basu's usage of the word was to merely portray a traditional Hindu cultural view in contrast to the political ideology, purveyed by Vinayak Damodar Savarkar. Savarkar, a right-wing nationalist and Indian freedom activist, wrote a book titled ''Hindutva: Who is a Hindu?" in 1923, in which he outlined his ideology and "the idea of a universal and essential Hindu identity". The term "Hindu identity" is broadly interpreted and distinguished from "ways of life and values of others". The contemporary meaning and usage of Hindutva largely derives from Savarkar's ideas, as does the post-1980s nationalism and mass political activity in India. According to scholar Christophe Jaffrelot, Hindutva as outlined in Savarkar's writings "perfectly illustrates" an effort at identity-building through the "stigmatisation and emulation of threatening others". In particular, it was pan-Islamism and similar "Pan-isms" that he assumed made the Hindus vulnerable, as he wrote:

Since Savarkar's time, the "Hindu identity" and the associated Hindutva ideology has been built upon the perceived vulnerability of Indian religions, culture and heritage from those who through "orientalist construction" have vilified them as inferior to a non-Indian religion, culture and heritage. In its nationalistic response, Hindutva has been conceived "primarily as an ethnic community" concept, states Jaffrelot, then presented as cultural nationalism, where Hinduism along with other Indian religions are but a part.

According to Arvind Sharma, a scholar of Hinduism, Hindutva has not been a "static and monolithic concept", rather its meaning and "context, text and subtext has changed over time". The struggles of the colonial era and the formulation of neo-Hinduism by the early 20th century added a sense of "ethnicity" to the original "Hinduness" meaning of Hindutva. Its early formulation incorporated the racism and nationalism concepts prevalent in Europe during the first half of the 20th century, and culture was in part rationalised as a result of "shared blood and race". Savarkar and his Hindutva colleagues adopted the social Darwinism theories prevalent by the 1930s. In the post-independence period, states Sharma, the concept has suffered from ambiguity and its understanding aligned on "two different axes" – one of religion versus culture, another of nation versus state. In general, the Hindutva thought among many Indians has "tried to align itself with the culture and nation" axes.

According to Prabhu Bapu, a historian and scholar of Oriental Studies, the term and the contextual meaning of Hindutva emerged from the Indian experience in the colonial era, memories of its religious wars as the Mughal Empire decayed, an era of Muslim and Christian proselytisation, a feeling that their traditions and cultures were being insulted, whereby the Hindu intellectuals formulated Hindutva as a "Hindu identity" as a prelude to a national resurgence and a unified Indian nation against the "foreign invaders". The development of "religious nationalism" and the demand by the Muslim leaders on the Indian subcontinent for the partition of British India into Muslim and non-Muslim nations during the first half of the 20th century, confirmed its narrative of geographical and cultural nationalism based on Indian culture and religions.

According to Chetan Bhatt, the various forms of Hindu nationalism including the recent "cultural nationalist" form of Hindutva, have roots in the second half of the 19th century. These are a "dense cluster of ideologies" of primordialism, and they emerged from the colonial experiences of the Indian people in conjunction with ideas borrowed from European thinkers but thereafter debated, adapted and negotiated. These ideas included those of a nation, nationalism, race, Aryanism, Orientalism, Romanticism and others. Decades before he wrote his treatise on Hindutva, Savarkar was already famous in colonial India for his version of 1857 "Mutiny" history. He studied in London between 1906 and 1910. There he discussed and evolved his ideas of "what constituted a Hindu identity", made friends with Indian student groups as well as non-Indian groups such as the Sinn Féin. He was a part of the underground home rule and liberation movement of Indians, before getting arrested for anti-British activities. His political activities and intellectual journeys through the European publications, according to Bhatt, influenced him, his future writings and the 20th-century Hindutva ideology that emerged from his writings.

Adoption
Savarkar's Hindutva ideology reached Keshav Baliram Hedgewar in Nagpur (Maharashtra) in 1925, and he found Savarkar's Hindutva inspirational. He visited Savarkar in Ratnagiri shortly after and discussed with him methods for organising the 'Hindu nation'. Savarkar and Hedgewar discussions led in September that year to Hedgewar starting Rashtriya Swayamsevak Sangh (RSS, lit. "National Volunteer Society") with this mission. This organisation rapidly grew to become the largest Hindu nationalist movement. However, the term Hindutva was not used to describe the ideology of the new organisation; it was Hindu Rashtra (Hindu nation), with one RSS publication stating, "it became evident that Hindus were the nation in Bharat and that Hindutva was Rashtriyatva [nationalism]."

Hedgewar's RSS not only propagated Hindutva ideology, it developed a grassroots organizational structure (shakhas) to reform the Hindu society. Village level groups met for morning and evening physical training sessions, martial training and Hindutva ideology lessons. Hedgewar kept RSS an ideologically active but an "apolitical" organisation. This practice of keeping out of national and international politics was retained by his successor M. S. Golwalkar through the 1940s. Philosopher Jason Stanley states "the RSS was explicitly influenced by European fascist movements, its leading politicians regularly praised Hitler and Mussolini in the late 1930s and 1940s." In 1931, B.S. Moonje met with Mussolini and expressed a desire to replicate the fascist youth movement in India. According to Sali Augustine, the core institution of Hindutva has been the RSS. While the RSS states that Hindutva is different from Hinduism, it has been linked to religion. Therefore "cultural nationalism" is a euphemism, states Augustine, and it is meant to mask the creation of a state with a "Hindu religious identity". According to Jaffrelot, the regional heads of the RSS have included Indians who are Hindus as well as those who belong to other Indian religions such as Jainism.

In parallel to the RSS, Savarkar after his release from the colonial prison joined and became the president of Akhil Bharatiya Hindu Mahasabha in 1937. There, he used the terms Hindutva and Hindu Rashtra liberally, according to Graham. Syama Prasad Mukherjee, who served as its president in 1944 and joined the Jawaharlal Nehru Cabinet after independence, was a Hindu traditionalist politician who wanted to uphold Hindu values but not necessarily to the exclusion of other communities. He asked for the membership of Hindu Mahasabha to be thrown open to all communities. When this was not accepted, he resigned from the party and founded a new political party in collaboration with the RSS. He understood Hinduism as a nationality rather than a community but, realising that this is not the common understanding of the term Hindu, he chose "Bharatiya" instead of "Hindu" to name the new party, which came to be called the Bharatiya Jana Sangh.

Growth
The cabinet of the first prime minister of India Jawaharlal Nehru banned the Hindutva ideology-based RSS and arrested more than 200,000 RSS volunteers, after Nathuram Vinayak Godse, a former volunteer of RSS, assassinated Mahatma Gandhi. Nehru also appointed government commissions to investigate the assassination and related circumstances. The series of investigations by these government commissions, states the Political Science scholar Nandini Deo, later found the RSS leadership and "the RSS innocent of a role in the assassination". The mass arrested RSS volunteers were released by the Indian courts, and the RSS has ever since used this as evidence of "being falsely accused and condemned".

According to the historian Robert Frykenberg specialising in South Asian Studies, the RSS membership enormously expanded in independent India. In this period, while RSS remained "discretely out of politics", Jan Sangh, another Hindutva-ideology-based organisation entered the political arena. The Jan Sangh had limited success in the Indian general elections between 1952 and 1971.; Quote: "We have now considered the main factors which worked against the Jana Sangh's attempt to become a major party in Indian politics [between 1951 and 1967]. It was seriously handicapped in electoral competition by the limitations of its organization and leadership, by its inability to gather support through appeals to Hindu nationalist sentiment, and by its failure to establish a broad base of social and economic interests." This was, in part, because of Jan Sangh's poor organisation and leadership, its focus on the Hindutva sentiment did not appeal to the voters, and its campaign lacked adequate social and economic themes. This was also, in part, because Congress party leaders such Indira Gandhi had co-opted some of the key Hindutva ideology themes and fused it with socialist policies and her father's Jawaharlal Nehru Soviet-style centrally controlled economic model. The Hindutva-inspired RSS continued its grassroots operations between 1947 and early 1970s, and its volunteers provided humanitarian assistance to Hindu and Sikh refugees from the partition of British India, victims of war and violence, and helped disaster victims to resettle economically.

Between 1975 and 1977, Indira Gandhi declared and enforced Emergency with press censorship, the arrests of opposition leaders, and the suspension of many fundamental human rights of Indian citizens. The abuses of Emergency triggered a mass resistance and the rapid growth of volunteers and political support to the Hindutva ideology.[a] ;[b] For various sides in the Judiciary versus the Executive authority on Indira Gandhi's government and Hindutva politicians during this period, see  Indira Gandhi and her party were voted out of power in 1977. The Hindutva ideology-based Jan Sangh members such as Atal Bihari Vajpayee, Brij Lal Varma and Lal Krishna Advani gained national prominence, and the Hindutva ideology sympathiser Morarji Desai became the prime minister of a coalition non-Congress government. This coalition did not last past 1980, and from the consequent break-up of coalition parties was founded the Bharatiya Janata Party in April 1980. This new national political party relied on the Hindutva ideology-based rural and urban grassroots organisations that had rapidly grown across India from the mid-1970s.

Hindutva under Modi (2014–present)
Since the 2014 Indian general election with the (BJP) Bharatiya Janata Party winning, the Premiership of Narendra Modi and state based (BJP) governments have pushed parts of the Hindutva agenda.

Abrogation of the special status  of Jammu and Kashmir
On 5 August 2019, the Modi administration revoked the special status, or limited autonomy, granted under Article 370 of the Indian Constitution to Jammu and Kashmir.Article 370 rendered toothless, Article 35A ceases to exist, The Economic Times, 5 August 2019.

Ayodhya dispute
On 9 November 2019, the Supreme Court of India passed resolution on creation of Ram Mandir on the disputed land of Ayodhya. The verdict also stated to provide  for creation of a mosque on another part of the land. The land was given to the Sunni Waqf Board. On 5 August 2019, Narendra Modi held the Bhoomipujan at the Ayodhya. He became the first prime minister to visit Ram Janmabhoomi and Hanuman Garhi.

Forced conversion bans

Many BJP-ruled states, such as Uttar Pradesh, Madhya Pradesh, Haryana and Karnataka, have considered laws designed to prevent forced conversions from Hinduism to Islam through marriage. Hindutva advocates call this "love jihad", and it is widely considered to be an Islamophobic conspiracy theory. In September 2020, Uttar Pradesh Chief Minister Yogi Adityanath asked his government to come up with a strategy to prevent "religious conversions in the name of love". On 31 October, he announced that a law to curb "love jihad" would be passed by his government. The law in Uttar Pradesh, which also includes provisions against "unlawful religious conversion", declares a marriage null and void if the sole intention was to "change a girl's religion" and both it and the one in Madhya Pradesh imposed sentences of up to 10 years in prison for those who broke the law. The ordinance came into effect on 28 November 2020 as the Prohibition of Unlawful Religious Conversion Ordinance. In December 2020, Madhya Pradesh approved an anti-conversion law similar to the Uttar Pradesh one. As of 25 November 2020, Haryana and Karnataka were still in discussion over similar ordinances. In April 2021, the Gujarat Assembly amended the Freedom of Religion Act, 2003, bringing in stringent provisions against forcible conversion through marriage or allurement, with the intention of targeting "love jihad". The Karnataka state cabinet also approved an anti-conversion bill, making it a law in December 2021.

Cow slaughter

There has been a rise in the number of incidents of cow vigilantism since the election of a Bharatiya Janata Party (BJP) majority in the Parliament of India in 2014. The frequency and severity of cow vigilante violence has been described as "unprecedented". Human Rights Watch has reported that there has been a surge in cow vigilante violence since 2015. The surge is attributed to the recent rise in Hindu nationalism in India. Many vigilante groups say they feel "empowered" by the victory of the Hindu nationalist BJP in the 2014 election.

According to a Reuters report, a total of 63 cow vigilante attacks had occurred in India between 2010 and mid 2017, most after Prime Minister Narendra Modi came to power in 2014. In these attacks between 2010 and June 2017, "28 Indians – 24 of them Muslims – were killed and 124 injured", states the Reuter's report.

Also many BJP states have passed laws against Cattle slaughter such as (2017), Gujarat, 6 June 2017, Uttar Pradesh's Chief Minister Yogi Adityanath directed the state police to take action against cow slaughter and cattle smuggling under the National Security Act and the Gangster Act, and in (2021) Assam Assembly passed a bill that prohibits the slaughter or sale of beef within a 5-km radius of any temple. The legislation seeks to ensure that permission for slaughter is not granted to areas that are predominantly inhabited by Hindu, Jain, Sikh and other non-beef eating communities or places that fall within a 5-km radius of a temple, satra and any other institution as may be prescribed by the authorities. Exemptions, however, might be granted for certain religious occasions.

 Vishva Hindu Parishad and Bharatiya Janata Party 

The RSS established a number of affiliate organisations after Indian Independence to carry its ideology to various parts of the society. Prominent among them is the Vishva Hindu Parishad, which was set up in 1964 with the objective of protecting and promoting the Hindu religion. It subscribed to Hindutva ideology, which came to mean in its hands political Hinduism and Hindu militancy.

A number of political developments in the 1980s caused a sense of vulnerability among the Hindus in India. This was much discussed and leveraged by the Hindutva ideology organisations. These developments include the mass killing of the Hindus by the militant Khalistan movement, the influx of undocumented Bangladeshi immigration into Assam coupled with the expulsion of Hindus from Bangladesh, the Congress-led government's pro-Muslim bias in the Shah Bano case as well as the Rushdie affair. The VHP and the BJP utilised these developments to push forward a militant Hindutva nationalist agenda leading to the Ram Janmabhoomi movement. The BJP officially adopted Hindutva as its ideology in its 1989 Palampur resolution.

The BJP claims that Hindutva represents "cultural nationalism" and its conception of "Indian nationhood", but not a religious or theocratic concept. It is "India's identity", according to the RSS Chief Mohan Bhagwat.

According to the Anthropologist and South Asia Politics scholar Thomas Hansen, Hindutva in the post-Independence era, has emerged as a political ideology and a populist form of Hindu nationalism. For Indian nationalists, it has subsumed "religious sentiments and public rituals into a larger discourse of national culture (Bharatiya culture) and the Hindu nation, Hindu rashtra", states Hansen. This notion has appealed to the masses in part because it "connects meaningfully with everyday anxieties of security, a sense of disorder" in modern Indian life. The Bharatiya Janata Party has deployed the Hindutva theme in its election campaign since early 1991, as well as nominated candidates who are affiliated with organisations that support the Hindutva ideology. The campaign language of the Congress Party leader Rajiv Gandhi in the 1980s mirrored those of Hindutva proponents. The political speeches and publications by Indian Muslim leaders have declared their "Islamic religious identity" being greater than any "political ideology or national identity". These developments, states Hansen, have helped Hindu nationalists spread essentialist constructions per contemporary Hindutva ideology.

Concepts and issues
Hindutva ideology has focused on the following issues:
 Political representation of Hindu nationalists, and in some cases exclusivist interests of the Hindus and Indic-centered culture.
 Jammu and Kashmir as an integral, inseparable part of India.

 Address Christian and Islamic proselytisation, religious conversion practices and the arithmetic of religious communities in India; insist that Muslims and Christians accept its doctrine of equality of religions
 Implement social justice, reservations and rural Indic interests according to the Hindutva model
 Textbook revision and educating Indian youth in the Hindutva version of Indian history
 Ayodhya and other sites of historic religious disputes
 Strengthen the defence forces of India
 Replace "pseudo-secularism" with "true secularism", the latter being the Western-style separation of religion and state
 Decentralize and reform the Indian economy, end the socialist, centrally-planned, state-owned economic model[a] ;[b] 
 Represent the diaspora and its Indic cultural interests in the international forums

Uniform Civil Code

The Hindutva leaders have sought a Uniform Civil Code for all the citizens of India, where the same law applies to all its citizens irrespective of the individual's religion. They state that differential laws based on religion violate the Indian Constitution and these differential laws have sowed the seeds of divisiveness between different religious communities. Under the current laws that were enacted in 1955–56, state John Hutchinson and Anthony Smith, the constitutionally directive principle of a Uniform Civil Code covers only non-Muslims. The Uniform Civil Code is opposed by the Muslim leaders. A Uniform Civil Code that applies equally to the Muslims in India is also opposed by political parties such as the Indian National Congress and the Communist Party.

Protection of Hindu interests
The followers of Hindutva are known for their criticism of the Indian government as too passive with regard to the exodus of Kashmiri Hindus by Kashmiri Muslim separatists and the 1998 Wandhama massacre, and advocates of Hindutva wish a harder stance in Jammu and Kashmir.

The supporters of Hindutva sought to protect the native Hindu culture and traditions especially those that symbolised the Hindu culture. They believe that Indian culture is identical with the Hindu culture. These include animals, language, holy structures rivers and medicine.

They opposed the continuation of Urdu being used as a vernacular language as they associated it with Muslims. They felt that Urdu symbolised a foreign culture. For them, Hindi alone was the unifying factor for all the diverse forces in the country. It even wanted to make Hindi as the official language of India and felt that it should be promoted at the expense of English and the other regional languages. However, this caused a state of tension and alarm in the non-Hindi regions. The non-Hindi regions saw it as an attempt by the north to dominate the rest of the country. Eventually, this demand was put down in order to protect the cultural diversity of the country.

Organisations

Hindutva is the guiding ideology of the Hindu nationalist Rashtriya Swayamsevak Sangh (RSS) and its affiliated family of organisations, the Sangh Parivar. In general, Hindutvavadis (followers of Hindutva) believe that they represent the well-being of Hinduism, Sikhism, Buddhism, Jainism and all other religions prominent in India.

Most nationalists are organised into political, cultural and social organisations using the concept of Hindutva as a political tool. The first Hindutva organisation formed was the RSS, founded in 1925. A prominent Indian political party, the Bharatiya Janata Party (BJP), is closely associated with a group of organisations that advocate Hindutva. They collectively refer to themselves as the "Sangh Parivar" or family of associations, and include the RSS, Bajrang Dal and the Vishva Hindu Parishad. Other organisations include:
 Hindu Swayamsevak Sangh, the overseas branch of the RSS
 Bharatiya Mazdoor Sangh, a workers' union
 Akhil Bharatiya Vidyarthi Parishad, a students' union
 Bharatiya Kisan Sangh, a farmers' organisation

Political parties that are independent from the Sangh Parivar's influence but that also espouse the Hindutva ideology include the Hindu Mahasabha, Prafull Goradia's Akhil Bharatiya Jana Sangh, and the Marathi nationalist Shiv Sena, although Shiv Sena today maintains a 'secular hindutva', and the Maharashtra Navnirman Sena. The Shiromani Akali Dal (SAD) is a Sikh religious party that maintained ties with Hindutva organisations and political parties, as they also represent Sikhism. By September 2020, SAD left the NDA over the farms bill.

Criticism and apologetics

Fascist and Nazi undertones

The Hindutva ideology of organisations such as RSS have long been compared to fascism or Nazism. An editorial published on 4 February 1948, for example, in the National Herald, the mouthpiece of the Indian National Congress party, stated that "it [RSS] seems to embody Hinduism in a Nazi form" with the recommendation that it must be ended.  Similarly, in 1956, another Congress party leader compared Hindutva-ideology based Jana Sangh to the Nazis in Germany. After the 1940s and 1950s, a number of scholars have labelled or compared Hindutva to fascism.[a] [b]  Marzia Casolari has linked the association and the borrowing of pre-World War II European nationalist ideas by early leaders of Hindutva ideology. According to the Concise Oxford Dictionary of Politics and International Relations, the term Hindutva has "fascist undertones". Many scholars have pointed out that early Hindutva ideologues were inspired by fascist movements in early 20th-century Italy and Germany.

The Indian Marxist economist and political commentator Prabhat Patnaik calls Hindutva "almost fascist in the classical sense". He states that the Hindutva movement is based on "class support, methods and programme". According to Patnaik, Hindutva has the following fascist ingredients: "an attempt to create a unified homogeneous majority under the concept of "the Hindus"; a sense of grievance against past injustice; a sense of cultural superiority; an interpretation of history according to this grievance and superiority; a rejection of rational arguments against this interpretation; and an appeal to the majority based on race and masculinity".

According to Jaffrelot, the early Hindutva proponents such as Golwalkar envisioned it as an extreme form of "ethnic nationalism", but the ideology differed from fascism and Nazism in three respects. First, unlike fascism and Nazism, it did not closely associate Hindutva with its leader. Second, while fascism emphasised the primacy of the state, Hindutva considered the state to be a secondary. Third, while Nazism emphasised primacy of the race, the Hindutva ideology emphasised primacy of the society over race. According to Achin Vanaik, several authors have labelled Hindutva as fascist, but such a label requires "establishing a fascist minimum". Hindu nationalism, states Vanaik, is "a specific Indian manifestation of a generic phenomenon [of nationalism] but not one that belongs to the genus of fascism".

According to Mark Juergensmeyer, a number of writers in India and outside India have variously described Hindutva as "fundamentalist" and "India's flirtation with native fascism", while others disagree. The debate on Hindutva is a matter of perspective. The Indians debate it from the perspective of their own colonial past and their contemporary issues, while the Euro-American view considers it from the global issues, their own experiences with fundamentalism in light of classic liberal and relativist positions, states Juergensmeyer.

Sociologists Chetan Bhatt and Parita Mukta have described difficulties in identifying Hindutva with fascism or Nazism, because of Hindutva's embrace of cultural rather than racial nationalism, its "distinctively Indian" character, and "the RSS's disavowal of the seizure of state power in preference for long-term cultural labour in civil society". They describe Hindutva as a form of "revolutionary conservatism" or "ethnic absolutism". According to Thomas Hansen, Hindutva represents a "conservative revolution" in postcolonial India, and its proponents have been combining "paternalistic and xenophobic discourses" with "democratic and universalist discourses on rights and entitlements" based on "desires, anxieties and fractured subjectivities" in India.

 Upper casteism 
When Prime Minister V. P. Singh launched the Mandal Commission to broaden reservations in government and public university jobs to a significant portion of the Shudras who were officially branded the Other Backward Classes (OBC), the mouthpiece of the Hindutva organisation RSS, Organiser magazine, wrote of "an urgent need to build up moral and spiritual forces to counter any fallout from an expected Shudra revolution". According to social scientist and economist Jean Drèze, the Mandal commission angered the upper castes and threatened to distance the OBCs, but the Babri Masjid's destruction and ensuing events helped to reduce this challenge and reunified Hindus on an anti-Muslim stance. He further claims  "The Hindutva project is a lifeboat for the upper castes in so far as it promises to restore the Brahminical social order" and the potential enemies of this ideology is anybody whose acts or might hinder the process of restoring the Brahminic social order. Drèze further claims that although Hindutva is known as a majoritarian movement, it can be best expressed as an oppressive minority movement. According to French political scientist Christophe Jaffrelot, the Sangh Parivar organisations with their Hindutva ideology have strived to impose the belief structure of the upper caste Hindus. According to Dalit rights activist and political theorist Kancha Ilaiah, "Hindutva Is Nothing But Brahminism" and that only "Dalitisation can effectively counter the danger of Brahminical fascism disguised as Hindutva".

Ahistorical premises, mythology as history
According to Jaffrelot, the Hindutva ideology has roots in an era where the fiction in ancient Indian mythology and Vedic antiquity was presumed to be valid. This fiction was used to "give sustenance to Hindu ethnic consciousness". Its strategy emulated the Muslim identity politics of the Khilafat movement after World War I, and borrowed political concepts from the West – mainly German. Hindutva organizations treat events in Hindu mythology as history. Hindutva organizations have been criticized for their belief in statements or practices that they claim to be both scientific and factual but are incompatible with the scientific method.

According to Anthony Parel, a historian and political scientist, Savarkar's Hindutva, Who is a Hindu? published in 1923 is a fundamental text of Hindutva ideology. It asserts, states Parel, India of the past to be "the creation of a racially superior people, the Aryans. They came to be known to the outside world as Hindus, the people beyond the Indus River. Their identity was created by their race (jati) and their culture (sanskriti). All Hindus claim to have in their veins the blood of the mighty race incorporated with and descended from the Vedic fathers. They created a culture – an ensemble of mythologies, legends, epic stories, philosophy, art and architecture, laws and rites, feasts and festivals. They have a special relationship to India: India is to them both a fatherland and a holy land." The Savarkar's text presents the "Hindu culture as a self-sufficient culture, not needing any input from other cultures", which is "an unhistorical, narcissistic and false account of India's past", states Parel.

The premises of early Hindu nationalist thought, states Chetan Bhatt, reflected the colonial era European scholarship and Orientalism of its times. The idea of "India as the cradle of civilization" (Voltaire, Herder, Kant, Schlegel), or as "humanity's homeland and primal philosophy" (Herder, Schlegel), or the "humanism in Hindu values" (Herder), or of Hinduism offering redemption for contemporary humanity (Schopenhauer), along with the colonial era scholarship of Frederich Muller, Charles Wilkins, William Jones, Alexander Hamilton and others were the natural intellectual matrix for Savarkar and others to borrow and germinate their Hindu nationalist ideas.

Chakravarthi Ram-Prasad, a Fellow of the British Academy and a scholar of Politics and Philosophy of Religion,  states that Hindutva is a form of nationalism that is expounded differently by its opponents and its proponents. The opponents of Hindutva either consider it as a fundamentalist ideology that "aims to regulate the working of civil society with the imperatives of Hindu religious doctrine", or alternatively, as another form of fundamentalism while accepting that Hinduism is a diverse collection of doctrines, is complex and is different than other religions. According to Ram-Prasad, the proponents of Hindutva reject these tags, viewing it to be their right and a desirable value to cherish their religious and cultural traditions. The Hindutva ideology according to Savarkar, states Ram-Prasad, is a "geography, race, and culture" based concept. However, the "geography" is not strictly territorial but is an "ancestral homeland of a people", and the "race" is not biogenetic but described as the historic descendants of the intermarriage of Aryans, native inhabitants and "different peoples" who arrived over time. So, "the ultimate category for Hindutva is culture", and this culture is "not strictly speaking religious, if by religion is meant a commitment to certain doctrines of transcendence", he states. The proponents state that in the Hindutva thought, there is a kernel of coherent and justifiable thesis about the Indian culture and history.

 Threats to academic freedom 
Hindutva ideology has been linked to threats to academics and students, both in India and the United States. For instance, in 2011, Hindutva activists successfully led a charge to remove an essay about the multiple narratives of Ramayanas from Delhi University's history syllabus. Romila Thapar, one of India's most eminent historians, has faced repeated Hindutva-led attacks. The Hindu right has been responsible for pushback against scholars of South Asia and Hinduism based in North America, including Wendy Doniger and Sheldon Pollock. Under BJP leadership, the Indian state has been accused of monitoring scholars and denying some research access. Audrey Truschke is one such example who remains frequent target of their threats.

In 2021, a group of North American-based scholars of South Asia formed a collective and published the Hindutva Harassment Field Manual to, they argue, answer the Hindutva threat to their academic freedom. They documented further incidents of Hindutva harassment of academics in North America, dating back to the 1990s. The Association for Asian Studies noted that Hindutva, described as a "majoritarian ideological doctrine" different from Hinduism, resorted to "increasing attacks on numerous scholars, artists and journalists who critically analyze its politics". A number of scholars and participants withdrew from the conference following the threats they received from ultranationalists and Hindutva supporters.

See also
 
 
 
 

 Explanatory notes 

References
 Citations 

 General sources 

 
 
 
 
 
 
 
 
 
 
 
 
 
 
 
 

 Further reading 
 Articles 

 Andersen, Walter K., "Bharatiya Janata Party: Searching for the Hindu Nationalist Face", In The New Politics of the Right: Neo–Populist Parties and Movements in Established Democracies, ed. Hans–Georg Betz and Stefan Immerfall (New York: St. Martin's Press, 1998), pp. 219–232. ( or )
 
 Embree, Ainslie T., ‘The Function of the Rashtriya Swayamsevak Sangh: To Define the Hindu Nation’, in Accounting for Fundamentalisms, The Fundamentalism Project 4, ed. Martin E. Marty and R. Scott Appleby (Chicago: The University of Chicago Press, 1994), pp. 617–652.
 Gold, Daniel, "Organised Hinduisms: From Vedic Truths to Hindu Nation" in: Fundamentalisms Observed: The Fundamentalism Project Vol. 4, eds. M. E. Marty, R. S. Appleby,  University of Chicago Press (1994), pp. 531–593.
 

 Books 
 Banerjee, Partha, In the Belly of the Beast: The Hindu Supremacist RSS and BJP of India (Delhi: Ajanta, 1998). 
 Bhatt, Chetan, Hindu Nationalism: Origins, Ideologies and Modern Myths, Berg Publishers (2001), .
 Chaturvedi, Vinayak, Hindutva and Violence: V. D. Savarkar and the Politics of History  (Albany: SUNY, 2022).
 Hansen, Thomas Blom; Roy, Srirupa, eds. (2022). Saffron Republic: Hindu Nationalism and State Power in India. Cambridge University Press.
 Desai, Radhika. Slouching Towards Ayodhya: From Congress to Hindutva in Indian Politics (2nd ed.), New Delhi: Three Essays, 2004.
 Nanda, Meera, The God Market: How Globalization Is Making India More Hindu, Noida, Random House India. 2009. .
 Nussbaum, Martha C., The Clash Within: Democracy, Religious Violence and India's Future, Harvard University Press, 2007. 
 
 
 Ruthven, Malise, Fundamentalism: A Very Short Introduction, Oxford University Press, USA (2007), .
 Sharma, Jyotirmaya, Hindutva: Exploring the Idea of Hindu Nationalism, Penguin Global (2004), .
 Smith, David James, Hinduism and Modernity, Blackwell Publishing 
 Webb, Adam Kempton, Beyond the global culture war: Global horizons, CRC Press (2006), .

 Hindu nationalist sources 
 Elst, Koenraad: The Saffron Swastika: The Notion of "Hindu Fascism". New Delhi: Voice of India, 2001, 2 Vols.,  IndiaStar Review of Books review, Asianet review
 Elst, Koenraad: Decolonizing the Hindu Mind: Ideological Development of Hindu Revivalism. Rupa, Delhi 2001.
 Goel, Sita Ram: Perversion of India's Political Parlance .  Voice of India, Delhi 1984.
 Goel, Sita Ram (editor): Time for Stock Taking. Whither Sangh Parivar? Voice of India, Delhi, 1997.
 Savarkar, Vinayak Damodar: Hindutva''.  Bharati Sahitya Sadan, Delhi 1989 (1923).
 Tembarai Krishnamachari, Rajesh: "Call for an intellectual kshatriya", South Asia Analysis Group, Paper 883, Jan 2004.

External links
 Hindutva Harassment Field Manual—On what to do in cases of Hindutva harassment

 
Bharatiya Janata Party
Criticism of Hinduism
Hindu nationalism
Political ideologies
Right-wing ideologies
Sangh Parivar
Islamophobia in India
Fascism in India